Elwaine Franklin Pomeroy (June 4, 1933–June 29, 2011) was an American politician and lawyer who served for 16 years in the Kansas State Senate.

Pomeroy was born in Topeka, Kansas, where he sold war bonds as a Boy Scout during World War II. He attended Washburn University for both undergraduate study and law school, and worked as a lawyer. In 1968, he was elected to the Kansas Senate, where he served for four terms, including spending eight years as chair of the Judiciary Committee. In 1984, he resigned from the Senate to serve on the Kansas Parole Board, where he served until 1990, after which he resumed private practice and worked as a lobbyist.

References

1933 births
2011 deaths
Republican Party Kansas state senators
Politicians from Topeka, Kansas
20th-century American politicians
Washburn University alumni
Washburn University School of Law alumni
Kansas lawyers
American lobbyists